The Hamas government of June 2007 led by Ismail Haniyeh of Hamas was the de facto government in the Gaza Strip after a fierce inter-factional Palestinian warfare in the Gaza Strip, in which Hamas ousted Fatah from the Gaza Strip. The Hamas government was not appointed by PA President Mahmoud Abbas nor approved by the Palestinian Legislative Council (PLC). It  exercised de facto rule over the Gaza Strip, and was not recognised by any foreign government.

On 14 June 2007, President Abbas dismissed the Haniyeh-led Palestinian unity government of March 2007 and appointed a Fatah-led PA government. Abbas also suspended articles in the Basic Law to dispense with the need for the Fatah government to obtain PLC approval. The PA government was widely recognized as the representative government of the Palestinian National Authority, the de jure authority in the Palestinian territories, with de facto control only in the West Bank. However, Haniyeh and Hamas claimed the Fatah-led PA government was illegitimate and unconstitutional. 

The Hamas government of June 2007, in parallel with the Fatah-led PA government of June 2007, succeeded the  Palestinian unity government of March 2007. Haniyeh reshuffled the Hamas government in September 2012, which is regarded as the second Hamas government in the Gaza Strip.

Members of the government

See also
Palestinian government
Palestinian government of June 2007 - Fatah government in the West Bank (widely recognized as the government of the Palestinian National Authority
Gaza War (2008–2009)
Blockade of the Gaza Strip

References

Gaza Strip governments
Palestinian politics
2007 establishments in the Palestinian territories
2012 disestablishments in the Palestinian territories
Cabinets established in 2007
Cabinets disestablished in 2012
2007 in the Gaza Strip
2012 in the Gaza Strip